The 2010–11 Barako Bull Energy Boosters season was the 11th and final season of the franchise in the Philippine Basketball Association (PBA).

Key dates
August 29: The 2009 PBA Draft took place in Fort Bonifacio, Taguig.

Draft picks

Roster

Philippine Cup

Eliminations

Standings

Commissioner's Cup
Team filed leave of absence. Did not participate.

Governors Cup
Team filed leave of absence. Did not participate.

Transactions

Pre-season

Trades

Philippine Cup

Free agents

Additions

Trades

References

Barako Bull Energy Boosters seasons
Barako Bull